The Congregation B'nai Jacob is a Conservative synagogue in Woodbridge, Connecticut.

History
Congregation B'nai Jacob was established in New Haven, Connecticut, in 1882. Founded by Orthodox Jewish refugees fleeing pogroms in the Russian Empire, it was first on Temple Street in New Haven, then moved to George Street in 1912, and finally moved to Woodbridge, Connecticut, following the construction of a new synagogue in the Moorish architectural style in 1961.

Notable congregants
 Josh Zeid, American-Israeli baseball player

References

Synagogues in Connecticut
History of New Haven, Connecticut
Woodbridge, Connecticut
Religious organizations established in 1882
Russian-Jewish culture in the United States
Ukrainian-American culture in Connecticut
Ukrainian-Jewish culture in the United States
1882 establishments in Connecticut
Synagogues completed in 1961